Petr Štindl (born March 7, 1990) is a Czech professional ice hockey defenceman. He played with HC Kometa Brno in the Czech Extraliga during the 2010–11 Czech Extraliga playoffs.

References

External links

1990 births
Czech ice hockey defencemen
HC Kometa Brno players
Living people
People from Vsetín
Sportspeople from the Zlín Region
HK Dukla Trenčín players
VHK Vsetín players
HC Dukla Jihlava players
LHK Jestřábi Prostějov players
HC Nové Zámky players
SK Horácká Slavia Třebíč players
BK Havlíčkův Brod players
Czech expatriate ice hockey players in Slovakia